Todd Richard Fischer (born September 15, 1960) is an American former professional baseball player who played part of one season for the California Angels of Major League Baseball (MLB). He holds the unusual distinction of losing a game without throwing a pitch: in a July 10, 1986 game against the Boston Red Sox, he balked home a runner in the bottom of the 12th inning immediately after entering the game. He would never again pitch in a major league game.

References

External links

1960 births
Living people
Albany-Colonie A's players
American expatriate baseball players in Canada
Baseball players from Columbus, Ohio
California Angels players
Edmonton Trappers players
Idaho Falls A's players
Madison Muskies players
Major League Baseball pitchers
Midland Angels players
American expatriate baseball players in Mexico
Florida SouthWestern Buccaneers baseball players